Peover Superior is a civil parish in Cheshire East, England. It contains 29 buildings that are recorded in the National Heritage List for England as designated listed buildings.  Of these, two are listed at Grade I, the highest grade, one is listed at Grade II*, the middle grade, and the others are at Grade II.  The parish is mainly rural, and most of the listed buildings are houses of various sizes, farmhouses, cottages, and associated structures.  The other listed buildings include a church with associated structures, a former water mill, a railway viaduct, and a mile post.

Key

Buildings

See also

Listed buildings in Toft
Listed buildings in Ollerton
Listed buildings in Marthall
Listed buildings in Snelson
Listed buildings in Lower Withington
Listed buildings in Goostrey
Listed buildings in Allostock
Listed buildings in Nether Peover
Listed buildings in Peover Inferior

References
Citations

Sources

Listed buildings in the Borough of Cheshire East
Lists of listed buildings in Cheshire